Holodactylus is a genus of small geckos, collectively known as the clawed geckos.

Distribution
Both species in the genus live in northeastern Africa.  The range of  Holodactylus africanus stretches from the  Maasai Steppe, on the border between Kenya and Tanzania to Ethiopia. The second species Holodactylus cornii has only been found in Ethiopia and Somalia.

Habitat
These terrestrial geckos mainly inhabit arid steppes and savannas. The females usually lay two soft-shelled eggs which are subsequently buried in moist substrate.

Species
 African clawed gecko, (Holodactylus africanus)
 East African clawed gecko, (Holodactylus cornii)

References

 
Lizard genera